Cloud CMS is an enterprise content management system offered under both a SaaS and an On-Premises model using Docker containers.  It was designed from the ground up to leverage a fully elastic architecture built on top of Amazon AWS, Elastic Search, and MongoDB in order to provide a "Headless" CMS.

History 
Michael Uzquiano founded Cloud CMS in 2010.  The goal was to design and build a product that was data-oriented, elastic and low-cost.  By utilizing Amazon's native and scalable services as well as emerging NoSQL databases like MongoDB, the Cloud CMS product emerged and found an early niche within digital agencies.

One major outgrowth of this was the productization of AlpacaJS, an HTML5 forms engine for web and mobile applications which uses a JSON Schema and simple Handlebars templates to generate great looking user interfaces in a presentation agnostic fashion.  AlpacaJS is made freely available by Cloud CMS under an Apache 2 license and is currently used by
Fox
Pearson
Sony
Virgin Mobile

Usage 
Enterprise content management for documents, web, mobile, images and application delivery.

See also 

 List of content management systems
 List of collaborative software
 Document collaboration
 Document-centric collaboration

References

 Listed in Forrester's 2016 "The Rise Of The Headless Content Management System"
 Alpaca Forms for jQuery (open source Cloud CMS project)
 Listed as Hot Vendor in WCM 2015 by Aragon Research
 Outstanding Content on the Go, according to Inc Magazine
 When to consider Cloud CMS for your content management project by Metaversant

Document management systems
Java (programming language) software
Content management systems